Alan Cross (born July 2, 1993) is former American football tight end. He played college football at Memphis and attended Millington Central
High School in Millington, Tennessee.

Professional career

After going undrafted in the 2016 NFL Draft, Cross signed with the Tampa Bay Buccaneers on May 2, 2016. He entered training camp competing for to be the Buccaneer's fourth or fifth tight end with Kivon Cartwright and Dan Vitale. On September 10, 2016, Cross was released by the Buccaneers. Three days later, he was signed to the Buccaneers' practice squad. He was promoted to the active roster after the arrest and release of Austin Seferian-Jenkins.

He became the Buccaneer's fourth tight end behind veterans Cameron Brate, Luke Stocker, and Brandon Myers. On September 25, 2016, he made his professional regular season debut during a 32–37 loss to the Los Angeles Rams. Throughout his rookie season, he appeared on special team's punt coverage teams, kick return, and was used as a fullback and blocking tight end.

On October 2, 2017, Cross was waived by the Buccaneers and was signed to the practice squad the next day. He was promoted to the active roster on November 29, 2017.

In 2018, Cross played in 14 games before suffering a shoulder injury in Week 15. He was placed on injured reserve on December 18, 2018.

References

External links
 Tampa Bay Buccaneers bio

1993 births
Living people
People from Millington, Tennessee
Players of American football from Tennessee
American football tight ends
American football fullbacks
Memphis Tigers football players
Tampa Bay Buccaneers players